Edward Russell "Tubby" Spencer (January 26, 1884 – February 1, 1945) was a catcher for the St. Louis Browns (1905–08), Boston Red Sox (1909), Philadelphia Phillies (1911), and Detroit Tigers (1916–18).

He led the American League in being hit by pitches (9) in 1917.  In nine seasons he played in 449 games and had 1,326 at bats, 106 runs, 298 hits, 43 doubles, 10 triples, 3 home runs, 133 RBI, 13 stolen bases, 87 walks, .225 batting average, .281 on-base percentage, .279 slugging percentage, 370 total bases, and 27 sacrifice hits.

He died in San Francisco, California at the age of 61.

References

External links

1884 births
1945 deaths
Major League Baseball catchers
Boston Red Sox players
Detroit Tigers players
Philadelphia Phillies players
St. Louis Browns players
Santa Clara Broncos baseball coaches
Waco Tigers players
St. Paul Saints (AA) players
Louisville Colonels (minor league) players
San Francisco Seals (baseball) players
Venice Tigers players
Vernon Tigers players
Norfolk Tars players
Salt Lake City Bees players
Seattle Rainiers players
Seattle Indians players
Los Angeles Angels (minor league) players
People from Oil City, Pennsylvania
Baseball players from Pennsylvania